Absolute Carnage is a 2019 comic book crossover published by Marvel Comics, by Donny Cates and Ryan Stegman.

Editorial history
The comic book event was first announced in March at the 2019 Chicago Comic & Entertainment Expo, followed by an online press conference. Donny Cates said that Carnage would be the main villain, and that the story involves all Marvel characters who have used a symbiote at some point and reference older stories involving Venom. He said that "Cletus Kasady is back, and he is deadlier than he's ever been. Absolute Carnage encompasses every single character who has ever worn a symbiote and every symbiote that has ever been, going all the way back to when Peter found the black suit. Going from there to Maximum Carnage to Venomized to everything... everyone is a target". It was followed by several comics with variant cover arts with their characters reimagined with the Carnage symbiote.

The tie-ins were announced in May. They feature Spider-Man, Venom, Deadpool, Miles Morales, Iron Fist and Scream, among others.

Plot

Issue 1

Chapter 1: The Bleeding King
While walking to Times Square, Eddie Brock explains to his son Dylan about how the Symbiotes were created by Knull as well as the Church of the New Darkness having resurrected Cletus Kasady. Upon arrival, Eddie notices that there are wanted posters for Venom for the deaths of Lee Price and several inmates at Ryker's Island. When they flee into the subway upon being trailed by a man in a trenchcoat, they encounter Cletus Kasady who shoves them onto the subway tracks. They are saved by the man in the trenchcoat who is actually the Venom symbiote in disguise. The Venom symbiote re-bonds to Eddie where it states to him that it has fully recovered from the dark magic that it absorbed. A pair of police officers arrive and hold Venom at gunpoint. When the train explodes, Venom shields Dylan as Dark Carnage appears. The Dark Carnage stands at 13 ft., is colored black and red with a white spiral on its head, a gaping maw, a skeletal appearance, and a white dragon emblem on its chest. Venom tells the police officers to get Dylan as far away from here as possible while he confronts Dark Carnage where he notices that Cletus' body is bonded to the Grendel symbiote. As Dark Carnage tries to rip the Venom symbiote off of Eddie, he claims that Knull is coming to destroy everything. Eddie uses the electrical rails of the subway to disable Dark Carnage as it briefly separates to reveal Cletus' corpse. While recuperating at an apartment, Eddie and Dylan are visited by Robbie Robertson. He notices Eddie's condition and calls Peter Parker.

Chapter 2: The God Son
Sometime later at The Coffee Bean & Tea Leaf, Spider-Man meets with Eddie and Dylan where he hears about Cletus being bonded to the Carnage symbiote, the approach of Knull as well as Eddie's encounters with Roland Treece and the Dinosaur People. Their discussion is interrupted by a news report about some bodies Angelo Fortunato, Carl Mach, Leslie Gesneria, and Thaddeus Ross where Eddie suspects that Anne Weying might be among the bodies in the pit. After thwarting a robbery, Spider-Man states to Eddie that he would ask Mister Fantastic for a solution that involves extracting the codices without killing people, but the timeline is unfeasible causing Eddie to take Spider-Man to meet with Maker. At the house of "Rex Strickland", Spider-Man and Venom meet Maker who is working on the S.C.I.T.H.E. (short for Symbiote Codex Isolation and Thermo-Heated Extraction) that was commissioned by Project Oversight. Normie Osborn was brought to Maker as he and Dylan get acquainted. When Spider-Man would not let the S.C.I.T.H.E. be tested on Dylan, Maker states that he wants to test it on Norman Osborn.

Chapter 3: The Long Red Dark
Spider-Man and Venom head to Ravencroft where Venom recalls when Norman Osborn bonded with the Carnage symbiote. Arriving at the maximum security cell block, Eddie confronts Norman Osborn. Meanwhile, John Jameson meets with Spider-Man as he states that Venom is his ally. When they meet up with Venom near Norman Osborn's cell, Spider-Man and Venom notice John Jameson in pain as it is revealed that Dark Carnage has bonded to him. As John Jameson fully turns into Dark Carnage, he informs Spider-Man that Knull is coming. Elsewhere in Ravencroft, Cletus is walking through the halls as he exposes his ribs to unleash the maggots in order for them to have the inmates be bonded to the Grendel symbiote. The inmates are transformed by the symbiotes into creatures that resemble Doppelganger. As Spider-Man and Venom fight the symbiote-controlled inmates, Venom had wished that Sentry was here to rip Carnage again. Spider-Man is then told by Venom that the Grendel symbiote has a weakness to electricity. Norman Osborn is freed from his cell as he attacks Spider-Man and Venom. Using an offshoot of the Grendel symbiote, Dark Carnage bonds it with Norman Osborn to recreate his Carnage form.

Issue 2
Dark Carnage has recreated Norman Osborn's Carnage appearance as he gloats that Knull will bring darkness and death to the universe. As Venom forms a wrecking ball to make a hole in the wall, Spider-Man wants to save Norman Osborn. Venom grabs Spider-Man as he carries him up the tower, creates dragon-like wings, and flies him away from Ravencroft. Dark Carnage tells Norman's Carnage form that there is nowhere that Spider-Man and Venom could escape to. After landing on a rooftop, Venom asks Spider-Man if they should go strolling up to Captain America and Wolverine, Spider-Man states that he would've handled them. After defeating Riot, Agony, Phage, and Lasher, Maker contacts Eddie and tells him that Dylan is fine. Maker informs Eddie about the grave that the Church of the New Darkness has made with the dead bodies. In addition, he also states that Anne Weying's body was never exhumed as he advises Venom to kill Dark Carnage before the situation gets worse. In his hideout beneath Grand Street, Dark Carnage is told by Norman's Carnage form that the murder pays in spades. Dark Carnage states to Norman's Carnage form that he is Cletus Kasady and not him. The hive is right now being amassed with Knull's powers. In SoHo, Manhattan, Miles Morales and Scorpion are fighting the Carnage Doppelgangers seeking to claim that Venom and Mania codex inside Scorpion. Venom catches up to them and advises Scorpion that they would set aside their grudge and save Miles. Venom throws him into the fray right into Norman's Carnage form. When he forms a blade to put into Scorpion's back, Miles uses his venom blast attack to fry part of the Carnage symbiote off of Norman's face enough for him to drop Scorpion. Venom has a horrified reaction when Miles is infected with a Grendel symbiote.

Issue 3
Miles has been transformed into a six-armed Carnage Doppelganger. Lamenting that he wasn't able to rescue Miles, Venom fights him as Scorpion calls for help. Eddie and the Venom symbiote have a disagreement when it comes to the Venom symbiote wanting to have Norman Osborn killed after Venom mentioned Normie enough to briefly bring Norman to his senses. As the Grendel symbiote heals Norman, Venom brings Scorpion to the house of "Rex Strickland" since Scorpion would be in danger if he was sent back to prison. Venom finds that Spider-Man has called in Captain America, Thing, Wolverine, and Bruce Banner. As Captain America is handed Scorpion whose spine was broken in the attack, Venom is told that Maker fled when they showed up. As Venom gets fully acquainted with Bruce Banner, Dylan comes in where he has befriended a Sleeper symbiote that has bonded to a cat. Hours later, a storm rages as Bruce monitors the S.C.I.T.H.E. As Eddie is placed in a pod part of the S.C.I.T.H.E., the real Eddie Brock comes in and states his knowledge of Spider-Man being Peter Parker. It is then discovered that Eddie is actually Dark Carnage in disguise. When Spider-Man asks Bruce of Dark Carnage would break out, Bruce doubts it. Dark Carnage cracks through Captain America's pod as the Carnage Doppelgangers break into the building. The Venom symbiote leaves Eddie and engulfs Bruce Banner. As Dark Carnage stabs Bruce during the bonding process, he is transformed into a venomized version of Hulk whose punch nearly separates the Grendel symbiote from Cletus Kasady. It was also noted that the Venom symbiote couldn't cover all of Hulk as he introduces himself to Dark Carnage.

Issue 4
While the Venomized Hulk fights Dark Carnage, Eddie Brock leads Spider-Man, Dylan Brock, and Normie Osborn to the door while assuring to Dylan that Sleeper can handle himself. Eddie asks Spider-Man to watch over Dylan while he gets the weapons that the Jury used on the Symbiotes. Eddie even equips himself with a Guardsman gauntlet and Captain America's shield. Eddie is then ambushed by the Carnage-possessed Miles Morales. Dark Carnage senses the power of the One Below All in Hulk where he plans to open it and paint it black like Knull's living abyss. When Dark Carnage tries to get the Venomized Hulk to side with him, Hulk punches Dark Carnage who sends tendrils into his head in order to mess with his mind. Using the cannon in the Guardsman gauntlet and charging Captain America's shield with it, Eddie Brock electrocutes the Symbiote on Miles enough to free him from its control. Afterward, Miles tells Eddie that he needs to get to the Venom Symbiote before Dark Carnage absorbs it and free Knull. Hulk regresses back to Bruce Banner and passes out just as Eddie and Miles arrive. Dark Carnage rips the Venom Symbiote off of Bruce as he assimilates it where he starts to grow horns, sharp spikes on his back, and black pauldrons and arm wraps similar to the ones on Knull. Captain America assures Eddie that he did all he can while punching a Carnage doppelganger. As Captain America takes back his shield, Thing and Wolverine arrive as the three of them charge towards Dark Carnage. Miles tells Eddie that the Carnage doppelgangers are attacking the S.C.I.T.H.E. and that Maker lied about destroying the Symbiote Codices. As Dark Carnage wipes the floor with Captain America, Thing, and Wolverine while Spider-Man fights the Carnage Norman Osborn, Eddie fights his way past the Carnage Doppelgangers to get to the S.C.I.T.H.E. Dark Carnage then turns his back spikes into wings as he plans to release Knull. Punching his hand into the S.C.I.T.H.E.'s container, Eddie becomes engulfed with the Symbiote Codices of Venom, Carnage, Riot, Agony, Lasher, Phage, Sleeper, Dreadface, Mania, Tyrannosaurus, and other unnamed Symbiotes which connects with the Venom Codex in his spine. While originally overwhelmed by the voices of the past Symbiote hosts, Eddie feels them melting together as the gestalt Symbiote transforms Eddie into a stronger, more focused version of Venom with powers of all the previous owners of the codices, not at one hundred percent though. Sprouting wings, Venom goes after Absolute Carnage and declares himself as the avenging fury of New York.

Issue 5
The issue begins with a flashback of Eddie Brock first meeting Cletus Kasady in prison. In the present, while Eddie fights Dark Carnage, Cloak, Dagger, Iron Fist, Firestar, Morbius, Deathlok, Captain Marvel, Deadpool, and Scream arrive to help in the battle. Meanwhile, Spider-Man collapses during the fight with Norman, leading Dylan to somehow detonate him. Dark Carnage attacks Dylan, holding him hostage and reminding Eddie of his choice: to let his son die and let Dark Carnage awaken Knull or to kill Dark Carnage and take all of his codices, awakening Knull himself. Choosing to save his son, Eddie creates a Necrosword out of his combined symbiotes to kill Carnage, freeing Knull in the process, who sets off for Earth. As Spider-Man leaves to check on the others, Eddie is confronted by Dylan about them being father and son.

Titles involved

Prelude
 Free Comic Book Day - FCBD 2019: Spider-Man/Venom #1
 Web of Venom: Carnage Born #1
 Web of Venom: Cult of Carnage #1
 Web of Venom: Funeral Pyre #1

Main series
 Absolute Carnage #1–5

Tie-in series
 Absolute Carnage vs. Deadpool #1–3
 Absolute Carnage: Lethal Protectors #1–3
 Absolute Carnage: Miles Morales #1–3
 Absolute Carnage: Scream #1–3
 Amazing Spider-Man (2018) #30–31
 Venom (2018) #17–20

One-shots
 Absolute Carnage: Avengers #1
 Absolute Carnage: Captain Marvel #1
 Absolute Carnage: Immortal Hulk #1
 Absolute Carnage: Separation Anxiety #1
 Absolute Carnage: Symbiote of Vengeance #1
 Absolute Carnage: Symbiote Spider-Man #1
 Absolute Carnage: Weapon Plus #1

Aftermath
 Ruins of Ravencroft: Carnage #1
 Ruins of Ravencroft: Dracula #1
 Ruins of Ravencroft: Sabretooth #1
 Ravencroft #1–5
 Scream: Curse of Carnage #1–5
 Venom (2018) #21–25

Critical reception 
The main storyline received overwhelmingly positive reviews, but the ending was criticized for its rushed pacing. According to Comic Book Roundup, the entire series had an average rating of 8.7 out of 10 based on 67 reviews.

Sequel
The events of Absolute Carnage culminate in an event series involving the coming of the Symbiote God Knull to Earth.  This sequel series is called "King in Black" and began in December 2020.

Collected editions

See also
 Maximum Carnage
 Venom: Lethal Protector
 Venomverse
 Venom vs. Carnage
 Reading Order

References

External links
 
 

Marvel Comics limited series